Ignazio Paternò Castello, Prince of Biscari (1722 - 1 September 1786) was an Italian polymath, antiquarian, and patron of the arts, who lived most of his life in his native Catania in Sicily.

Biography
Born to a wealthy noble family, he studied under the Theatines in Palermo.

His fondness for he classical heritage and his endowment as a prince, allowed him to foster many excavations and restorations of ancient monuments in Sicily, and collected a large collection of Greco-Roman artifacts, including vases, urns, medals and coins. He helped further excavate part of the Roman theater and amphitheater at Catania.

He was prolific at communicating his findings and writing to other scholars in the continent. He was granted honorary membership in the Royal Society of London, the Academy of Bordeaux, the Accademia della Crusca and of the Georgofili of Florence, of the Arcadi of Rome, as well as academies in Naples, Palermo, and in his home of Catania. He employed the architect Francesco Battaglia to refurbish his Palazzo Biscari in Catania. This palace once held many of his collections, but they are now housed in the Museo Civico Castello Ursino. He patronized the construction of a bridge in Aragona.

Works
Viaggio per tutte le antichità di Sicilia (1781)
Descrizione del terribile tremuoto del 5 febbraio 1783
Ragionamento sopra gli antichi ornamenti e trastulli de' bambini
Memoria al senato di Catania, relativamente al molo da tcostruiris nella marian di quella citta (1771)
Discorso accademico sopra un antica Iscrizione trovata nel teatro di Catania

References

External links
 

1722 births
1786 deaths
Italian antiquarians
18th-century Italian writers
18th-century Italian male writers
People from Sicily